Bear Creek Studio is a residential recording studio located in Woodinville, Washington and is located in a barn on a 10 acre farm. Bear Creek is known for its "rural farmhouse" location. A number of artists have recorded at the studio, including: Brandi Carlile, Train, The Lumineers, Soundgarden, Foo Fighters, James Brown, Modest Mouse, L.A. Edwards, Geoff Tate, The Tragically Hip, Eric Clapton and Lionel Richie. James Shaw of Metric called it "the oldest family owned studio in America, and is a really special place." Chris Cornell said: "It was such a pleasant place, we didn't want to leave."

History 

Bear Creek Studio was established in 1977 by Joe and Manny Hadlock. Their son, Ryan, has since taken over as chief engineer and has learned the family trade over time, earning credit as producer, engineer, and mixer on a variety of different works. Originally a 19th century dairy barn, in 1977 Joe Hadlock decided to convert the 1750 sq. foot structure into a state-of-the-art recording studio while retaining the rural setting. Working with architect Doug Thompson, a new post and beam structure was created on the footprint of the old barn. In the mid-nineties, a new tracking room was constructed which doubled the size of the studio. The studio was also used for commercials from time to time, but the Hadlocks kept those two sides of their business separated, as it was considered in the music industry "not hip" to do commercials.

In 2014, a new recording studio was built in a treehouse, as featured on the February 21 episode of Treehouse Masters.

Discography

References

External links 

1977 establishments in Washington (state)
Buildings and structures in King County, Washington
Recording studios in Washington (state)